300 (three hundred) is the natural number following 299 and preceding 301.

Mathematical properties 

The number 300 is a triangular number and the sum of a pair of twin primes (149 + 151), as well as the sum of ten consecutive primes (13 + 17 + 19 + 23 + 29 + 31 + 37 + 41 + 43 + 47).
It is palindromic in 3 consecutive bases: 30010 = 6067 = 4548 = 3639, and also in base 13.  Factorization is  30064 + 1 is prime

Integers from 301 to 399

300s

301 

301 = 7 × 43 = . 301 is the sum of three consecutive primes (97 + 101 + 103), happy number in base 10, lazy caterer number .

302 

302 = 2 × 151. 302 is a nontotient, a happy number, the number of partitions of 40 into prime parts

303 

303 = 3 × 101. 303 is a palindromic semiprime. The number of compositions of 10 which cannot be viewed as stacks is 303.

304 

304 = 24 × 19. 304 is the sum of six consecutive primes (41 + 43 + 47 + 53 + 59 + 61), sum of eight consecutive primes (23 + 29 + 31 + 37 + 41 + 43 + 47 + 53), primitive semiperfect number, untouchable number, nontotient. 304 is the smallest number such that no square has a set of digits complementary to the digits of the square of 304: The square of 304 is 92416, while no square exists using the set of the complementary digits 03578.

305 

305 = 5 × 61. 305 is the convolution of the first 7 primes with themselves.

306 

306 = 2 × 32 × 17. 306 is the sum of four consecutive primes (71 + 73 + 79 + 83), pronic number, and an untouchable number.

307 

307 is a prime number, Chen prime, number of one-sided octiamonds

308 

308 = 22 × 7 × 11. 308 is a nontotient, totient sum of the first 31 integers, heptagonal pyramidal number, and the sum of two consecutive primes (151 + 157).

309 

309 = 3 × 103, Blum integer, number of primes <= 211.

310s

310 

310 = 2 × 5 × 31. 310 is a sphenic number, noncototient, number of Dyck 11-paths with strictly increasing peaks.

311 

311 is a prime number. 4311 - 3311 is prime

312 

312 = 23 × 3 × 13, idoneal number.

313 

313 is a prime number.

314 

314 = 2 × 157. 314 is a nontotient, smallest composite number in Somos-4 sequence.

315 

315 = 32 × 5 × 7 =  rencontres number, highly composite odd number, having 12 divisors.

316 

316 = 22 × 79. 316 is a centered triangular number and a centered heptagonal number

317 

317 is a prime number, Eisenstein prime with no imaginary part, Chen prime, and a strictly non-palindromic number.

317 is the exponent (and number of ones) in the fourth base-10 repunit prime.

318 

318 = 2 × 3 × 53. It is a sphenic number, nontotient, and the sum of twelve consecutive primes (7 + 11 + 13 + 17 + 19 + 23 + 29 + 31 + 37 + 41 + 43 + 47)

319 

319 = 11 × 29. 319 is the sum of three consecutive primes (103 + 107 + 109), Smith number, cannot be represented as the sum of fewer than 19 fourth powers, happy number in base 10

320s

320 

320 = 26 × 5 = (25) × (2 × 5). 320 is a Leyland number, and maximum determinant of a 10 by 10 matrix of zeros and ones.

321 

321 = 3 × 107, a Delannoy number

322 

322 = 2 × 7 × 23. 322 is a sphenic, nontotient, untouchable, and a Lucas number.

323 

323 = 17 × 19. 323 is the sum of nine consecutive primes (19 + 23 + 29 + 31 + 37 + 41 + 43 + 47 + 53), the sum of the 13 consecutive primes (5 + 7 + 11 + 13 + 17 + 19 + 23 + 29 + 31 + 37 + 41 + 43 + 47), Motzkin number. A Lucas and Fibonacci pseudoprime. See 323 (disambiguation)

324 

324 = 22 × 34 = 182. 324 is the sum of four consecutive primes (73 + 79 + 83 + 89), totient sum of the first 32 integers, a square number, and an untouchable number.

325 

325 = 52 × 13. 325 is a triangular number, hexagonal number, nonagonal number, centered nonagonal number. 325 is the smallest number to be the sum of two squares in 3 different ways: 12 + 182, 62 + 172 and 102 + 152. 325 is also the smallest (and only known) 3-hyperperfect number.

326 

326 = 2 × 163. 326 is a nontotient, noncototient, and an untouchable number. 326 is the sum of the 14 consecutive primes (3 + 5 + 7 + 11 + 13 + 17 + 19 + 23 + 29 + 31 + 37 + 41 + 43 + 47), lazy caterer number .

327 

327 = 3 × 109. 327 is a perfect totient number, number of compositions of 10 whose run-lengths are either weakly increasing or weakly decreasing

328 

328 = 23 × 41. 328 is a refactorable number, and it is the sum of the first fifteen primes (2 + 3 + 5 + 7 + 11 + 13 + 17 + 19 + 23 + 29 + 31 + 37 + 41 + 43 + 47).

329 

329 = 7 × 47. 329 is the sum of three consecutive primes (107 + 109 + 113), and a highly cototient number.

330s

330 

330 = 2 × 3 × 5 × 11. 330 is sum of six consecutive primes (43 + 47 + 53 + 59 + 61 + 67), pentatope number (and hence a binomial coefficient ), a pentagonal number, divisible by the number of primes below it, and a sparsely totient number.

331 

331 is a prime number, super-prime, cuban prime, sum of five consecutive primes (59 + 61 + 67 + 71 + 73), centered pentagonal number, centered hexagonal number, and Mertens function returns 0.

332 

332 = 22 × 83, Mertens function returns 0.

333 

333 = 32 × 37, Mertens function returns 0,

334 

334 = 2 × 167, nontotient.

335 

335 = 5 × 67, divisible by the number of primes below it, number of Lyndon words of length 12.

336 

336 = 24 × 3 × 7, untouchable number, number of partitions of 41 into prime parts.

337 

337, prime number, emirp, permutable prime with 373 and 733, Chen prime, star number

338 

338 = 2 × 132, nontotient, number of square (0,1)-matrices without zero rows and with exactly 4 entries equal to 1.

339 

339 = 3 × 113, Ulam number

340s

340 

340 = 22 × 5 × 17, sum of eight consecutive primes (29 + 31 + 37 + 41 + 43 + 47 + 53 + 59), sum of ten consecutive primes (17 + 19 + 23 + 29 + 31 + 37 + 41 + 43 + 47 + 53), sum of the first four powers of 4 (41 + 42 + 43 + 44), divisible by the number of primes below it, nontotient, noncototient.

341 

341 = 11 × 31, sum of seven consecutive primes (37 + 41 + 43 + 47 + 53 + 59 + 61), octagonal number, centered cube number, super-Poulet number.
341 is the smallest Fermat pseudoprime; it is the least composite odd modulus m greater than the base b, that satisfies the Fermat property "bm−1 − 1 is divisible by m", for bases up to 128 of b = 2, 15, 60, 63, 78, and 108.

342 

342 = 2 × 32 × 19, pronic number, Untouchable number.

343 

343 = 73, the first nice Friedman number that is composite since 343 = (3 + 4)3. It's the only known example of x2+x+1 = y3, in this case, x=18, y=7. It is z3 in a triplet (x,y,z) such that x5 + y2 = z3.

344 

344 = 23 × 43, octahedral number, noncototient, totient sum of the first 33 integers, refactorable number.

345 

345 = 3 × 5 × 23, sphenic number, idoneal number

346 

346 = 2 × 173, Smith number, noncototient.

347 

347 is a prime number, emirp, safe prime, Eisenstein prime with no imaginary part, Chen prime, Friedman prime since 347 = 73 + 4, and a strictly non-palindromic number.

348 

348 = 22 × 3 × 29, sum of four consecutive primes (79 + 83 + 89 + 97), refactorable number.

349 

349, prime number, sum of three consecutive primes (109 + 113 + 127), 5349 - 4349 is a prime number.

350s

350 

350 = 2 × 52 × 7 = , primitive semiperfect number, divisible by the number of primes below it, nontotient, a truncated icosahedron of frequency 6 has 350 hexagonal faces and 12 pentagonal faces.

351 

351 = 33 × 13, triangular number, sum of five consecutive primes (61 + 67 + 71 + 73 + 79), member of Padovan sequence and number of compositions of 15 into distinct parts.

352 

352 = 25 × 11, the number of n-Queens Problem solutions for n = 9. It is the sum of two consecutive primes (173 + 179), lazy caterer number .

353 

353 is a prime number, Chen prime, Proth prime, Eisenstein prime with no imaginary part, palindromic prime, and Mertens function returns 0. 353 is the base of the smallest 4th power that is the sum of 4 other 4th powers, discovered by Norrie in 1911: 3534 = 304 + 1204 + 2724 + 3154. 353 is an index of a prime Lucas number.

354 

354 = 2 × 3 × 59 = 14 + 24 + 34 + 44, sphenic number, nontotient, also SMTP code meaning start of mail input. It is also sum of absolute value of the coefficients of Conway's polynomial.

355 

355 = 5 × 71, Smith number, Mertens function returns 0, divisible by the number of primes below it.

The numerator of the best simplified rational approximation of pi having a denominator of four digits or fewer.  This fraction (355/113) is known as Milü and provides an extremely accurate approximation for pi.

356 

356 = 22 × 89, Mertens function returns 0.

357 

357 = 3 × 7 × 17, sphenic number.

358 

358 = 2 × 179, sum of six consecutive primes (47 + 53 + 59 + 61 + 67 + 71), Mertens function returns 0, number of ways to partition {1,2,3,4,5} and then partition each cell (block) into subcells.

359 

359 is a prime number, Sophie Germain prime, safe prime, Eisenstein prime with no imaginary part, Chen prime, and strictly non-palindromic number.

360s

360 

360 = triangular matchstick number.

361 

361 = 192, centered triangular number, centered octagonal number, centered decagonal number, member of the Mian–Chowla sequence; also the number of positions on a standard 19 x 19 Go board.

362 

362 = 2 × 181 = σ2(19): sum of squares of divisors of 19, Mertens function returns 0, nontotient, noncototient.

363 

363 = 3 × 112, sum of nine consecutive primes (23 + 29 + 31 + 37 + 41 + 43 + 47 + 53 + 59), Mertens function returns 0, perfect totient number.

364 

364 = 22 × 7 × 13, tetrahedral number, sum of twelve consecutive primes (11 + 13 + 17 + 19 + 23 + 29 + 31 + 37 + 41 + 43 + 47 + 53), Mertens function returns 0, nontotient.
It is a repdigit in base 3 (111111), base 9 (444), base 25 (EE), base 27 (DD), base 51 (77) and base 90 (44), the sum of six consecutive powers of 3 (1 + 3 + 9 + 27 + 81 + 243), and because it is the twelfth non-zero tetrahedral number.

365 

365 = 5 × 73

366 

366 = 2 × 3 × 61, sphenic number, Mertens function returns 0, noncototient, number of complete partitions of 20, 26-gonal and 123-gonal.

367 

367 is a prime number, Perrin number, happy number, prime index prime and a strictly non-palindromic number.

368 

368 = 24 × 23. It is also a Leyland number.

369 

369 = 32 × 41, it is the magic constant of the 9 × 9 normal magic square and n-queens problem for n = 9; there are 369 free polyominoes of order 8. With 370, a Ruth–Aaron pair with only distinct prime factors counted.

370s

370 

370 = 2 × 5 × 37, sphenic number, sum of four consecutive primes (83 + 89 + 97 + 101), nontotient, with 369 part of a Ruth–Aaron pair with only distinct prime factors counted, Base 10 Armstrong number since 33 + 73 + 03 = 370.

371 

371 = 7 × 53, sum of three consecutive primes (113 + 127 + 131), sum of seven consecutive primes (41 + 43 + 47 + 53 + 59 + 61 + 67), sum of the primes from its least to its greatest prime factor , the next such composite number is 2935561623745, Armstrong number since 33 + 73 + 13 = 371.

372 

372 = 22 × 3 × 31, sum of eight consecutive primes (31 + 37 + 41 + 43 + 47 + 53 + 59 + 61), noncototient, untouchable number, refactorable number.

373 

373, prime number, balanced prime, two-sided prime, sum of five consecutive primes (67 + 71 + 73 + 79 + 83), permutable prime with 337 and 733, palindromic prime in 3 consecutive bases: 5658 = 4549 = 37310 and also in base 4: 113114.

374 

374 = 2 × 11 × 17, sphenic number, nontotient, 3744 + 1 is prime.

375 

375 = 3 × 53, number of regions in regular 11-gon with all diagonals drawn.

376 

376 = 23 × 47, pentagonal number, 1-automorphic number, nontotient, refactorable number.

377 

377 = 13 × 29, Fibonacci number, a centered octahedral number, a Lucas and Fibonacci pseudoprime, the sum of the squares of the first six primes.

378 

378 = 2 × 33 × 7, triangular number, cake number, hexagonal number, Smith number.

379 

379 is a prime number, Chen prime, lazy caterer number  and a happy number in base 10. It is the sum of the 15 consecutive primes (3 + 5 + 7 + 11 + 13 + 17 + 19 + 23 + 29 + 31 + 37 + 41 + 43 + 47 + 53). 379! - 1 is prime.

380s

380 

381 

381 = 3 × 127, palindromic in base 2 and base 8.

It is the sum of the first 16 prime numbers (2 + 3 + 5 + 7 + 11 + 13 + 17 + 19 + 23 + 29 + 31 + 37 + 41 + 43 + 47 + 53).

382 

382 = 2 × 191, sum of ten consecutive primes (19 + 23 + 29 + 31 + 37 + 41 + 43 + 47 + 53 + 59), Smith number.

383 

383, prime number, safe prime, Woodall prime, Thabit number, Eisenstein prime with no imaginary part, palindromic prime. It is also the first number where the sum of a prime and the reversal of the prime is also a prime. 4383 - 3383 is prime.

384

385 

385 = 5 × 7 × 11, sphenic number, square pyramidal number, the number of integer partitions of 18.

385 = 102 + 92 + 82 + 72 + 62 + 52 + 42 + 32 + 22 + 12

386 

386 = 2 × 193, nontotient, noncototient, centered heptagonal number, number of surface points on a cube with edge-length 9.

387 

387 = 32 × 43, number of graphical partitions of 22.

388 

388 = 22 × 97 = solution to postage stamp problem with 6 stamps and 6 denominations, number of uniform rooted trees with 10 nodes.

389 

389, prime number, emirp, Eisenstein prime with no imaginary part, Chen prime, highly cototient number, strictly non-palindromic number. Smallest conductor of a rank 2 Elliptic curve.

390s

390 

390 = 2 × 3 × 5 × 13, sum of four consecutive primes (89 + 97 + 101 + 103), nontotient,
 is prime

391 

391 = 17 × 23, Smith number, centered pentagonal number.

392 

392 = 23 × 72, Achilles number.

393 

393 = 3 × 131, Blum integer, Mertens function returns 0.

394 

394 = 2 × 197 = S5 a Schröder number, nontotient, noncototient.

395 

395 = 5 × 79, sum of three consecutive primes (127 + 131 + 137), sum of five consecutive primes (71 + 73 + 79 + 83 + 89), number of (unordered, unlabeled) rooted trimmed trees with 11 nodes.

396 

396 = 22 × 32 × 11, sum of twin primes (197 + 199), totient sum of the first 36 integers, refactorable number, Harshad number, digit-reassembly number.

397 

397, prime number, cuban prime, centered hexagonal number.

398 

398 = 2 × 199, nontotient.
 is prime

399 

399 = 3 × 7 × 19, sphenic number, smallest Lucas–Carmichael number, Leyland number of the second kind. 399! + 1 is prime.

References 

Integers